The South Asian Games (SAG or SA Games), formerly known as the South Asian Federation Games (SAFG or SAF Games), is a quadrennial multi-sport event held among the athletes from South Asia. The governing body of these games is South Asia Olympic Council (SAOC), formed in 1983. Currently, the SAOC comprises 7 member countries, namely Bangladesh, Bhutan, India, Maldives, Nepal, Pakistan, and Sri Lanka. Afghanistan participated 4 times in the SAF Games since 2004, but left the SAOC after participating in the 2016th edition and joined CAOC.

The first South Asian Games were hosted by Kathmandu, Nepal in 1984. From 1984 to 1987 they were held every year except 1986, as it was a year of Commonwealth Games and Asian Games. From 1987 onwards, they have been held every two years except for some occasions. In 2004, it was decided in the 32nd meeting of South Asian Sports Council to rename the games from the South Asian Federation Games to the South Asian Games as officials believed the word Federation was diminishing the emphasis on the event and acting as a barrier to attracting spectators. These Games are often hyped as the South Asian version of Olympic Games. The XIII South Asian Games was held at Kathmandu, Pokhara and Janakpur from 1 December to 10 December 2019.

The South Asian Games is one of five subregional Games of the Olympic Council of Asia (OCA). The others are the Central Asian Games, the East Asian Youth Games, the Southeast Asian Games (SEA Games), and the West Asian Games.

List of South Asian Games

Sports 
Following 28 sports have been competed in South Asian Games history till latest edition:

Overall performance 
As of the conclusion of the 2019 South Asian Games.

All-time medal table 
As of the conclusion of the 2019 South Asian Games. (Updated after doping results)

1Left SAOC and joined CAG.

Original Articles 

 India at the South Asian Games
 Pakistan at the South Asian Games
 Sri Lanka at the South Asian Games
 Nepal at the South Asian Games
 Bangladesh at the South Asian Games
 Afghanistan at the South Asian Games
 Bhutan at the South Asian Games
 Maldives at the South Asian Games

Detailed Medal Table by Years 
''Note : Medals not updated in official websites after doping results

Related Games

South Asian Beach Games

South Asian Winter Games

See also 

 Traditional games of South Asia

 Events of the OCA (Continental)
 Asian Games
 Asian Winter Games
 Asian Youth Games
 Asian Beach Games
 Asian Indoor and Martial Arts Games

 Events of the OCA (Subregional)
 Central Asian Games
 East Asian Games (now defunct)
 East Asian Youth Games
 Southeast Asian Games
 West Asian Games

 Events of the APC (Continental)
 Asian Para Games
 Asian Winter Para Games
 Asian Youth Para Games
 Asian Youth Winter Para Games

 Events of the APC (Subregional)
 ASEAN Para Games

References

External links 
 SAG official website

 
Asian international sports competitions
Recurring sporting events established in 1984
Multi-sport events in Asia
Sport in South Asia